Jamie Dunn (born 12 August 1950) is an Australian television and radio personality, puppeteer, comedian, and voice artist.

Starting his entertainment career as a singer, Dunn moved into television, working the puppet Agro on Agro's Cartoon Connection, Seven's Super Saturday and The Super Sunday Show.

Television
For three decades Dunn has been the voice and personality of children's character Agro.

Dunn is the narrator of the Animal Planet series Snake Boss.

Radio
Up until 2005, Dunn was a member of a radio breakfast show in Brisbane. Dunn was an original member of the B105 Morning Crew, along with Donna Lynch and Ian Skippen when the station was first launched on the FM band in 1990. Whereas originally Dunn performed on B105 as Agro, over time he came to be credited as himself. The B105 Morning Crew led the breakfast time slot ratings until the end of 2004 (for about 115 consecutive radio surveys).

Dunn performed stunts such as dressing in a gold string bikini as a meter-maid for a stroll around town, dressing as a bride for the "Bridezilla" competition, performing a cheerleader routine during the halftime break at a Broncos game, being scrubbed head to toe in a portable dog wash, and a nude dash across a stage.

Dunn raised money through the station for the Royal Children's Hospital. The appeal aimed to raise money for vital equipment for the hospital based solely on donations from businesses and people in Brisbane. Dunn promoted the annual Christmas Appeal, including taking part in the 'K's for Kids' walk that stretched across Brisbane. Dunn has been an active ambassador for the conservationist organisation, Wildlife Warriors.

On 21 September 2005, Dunn announced he was leaving B105 and in 2006, he and Agro began to present on the "Zinc Morning Zoo" with Ian Calder and Courtney Burns on Sunshine Coast FM radio station "Zinc 96." He left Zinc96 on 17 October 2008.

In 2009 Dunn began broadcasting a talk-back show on 1116 4BC, departing on 29 October 2010.

Dunn returned to Brisbane radio nearly a decade later to host an hourly Saturday morning show on the Triple M network.

Other performances
Dunn's early performing days were spent as a singer songwriter and as drummer for the Brisbane band Hands Down. He began his career on Channel Seven's Wombat.

Dunn co-starred in the film True Love directed by Robert Braiden for which he won the first Runner up Best Actor Award at the 2012 Picture Start Film Festival in New York.

Subject of stalking
Between 2012 and September 2014, Dunn was the subject of a stalker responsible for online harassment and threats of violence. This stalker, a journalist whom he met several times but hardly knew, was sending up to 50 emails a day. She pleaded guilty to stalking in Caboolture Magistrates' Court in December 2014, and was fined $1000 and put on a two-year good behaviour bond, with no conviction recorded.

Discography

Charting singles

References

External links
 

Australian male comedians
Australian male singers
Australian puppeteers
Australian radio presenters
Living people
1950 births
Male actors from Brisbane